Deborah Lacey is an American actress.

Career

Lacey had a recurring role in the final season of Star Trek: Deep Space Nine as Sarah Sisko, the mother of Benjamin Sisko. More recently, Lacey had the recurring role of Carla in Mad Men. Lacey has made guest starring appearances in The A-Team, Highway to Heaven, Doogie Howser, M.D., Frasier, Sliders, Cybill, House and Bones.

Filmography

Film

Television

References

External links
Interview on Mad Men

Living people
Year of birth missing (living people)
American television actresses
African-American actresses
American film actresses
American stage actresses
21st-century African-American people
21st-century African-American women